The Ann Arbor Hands-On Museum, located in Ann Arbor, Michigan, United States, specializes in interactive exhibits with the goal of helping both children and adults discover the scientist within them by promoting science literacy through experimentation, exploration, and education.

History 

The Ann Arbor Hands-On Museum was founded in 1978, with approval from the city of Ann Arbor, as a touring collection of exhibits built by local specialists and volunteers. The museum opened at its permanent location in 1982 in the city's historic brick firehouse with 25 exhibits on two floors, one staff person, and ten volunteers.

During the museum's first year of operation, it welcomed 25,000 guests. Children and adults both expressed great curiosity and enthusiasm, which pushed the museum to accelerate its expansion plans. Four years later, the museum opened the third and fourth floors of the firehouse with the help of a Kresge Foundation Challenge Grant. In 1993, the museum purchased several adjoining buildings, which led to the introduction of expanded facilities and educational programs in October 1999. Five separate grants received over several years from the National Science Foundation funded the creation of new exhibits, including "How Things Work" and "Solve-It Central", which toured through many science museums throughout the United States and Canada.

The Ann Arbor Hands-On Museum now features over 250 interactive exhibits on subjects including physics, geology, math, music, and technology while entertaining over 200,000 visitors each year. More than just a local attraction, the now over 40,000 square foot museum has become a regional destination that draws more than 60 percent of its visitors from outside the Ann Arbor area. The Detroit Free Press named it the Best Museum in 2003, and the museum has also received national recognition by the National Science Foundation, the Institute of Museum and Library Services and the Association of Science and Technology Centers.

Outreach programs 
The Outreach Program began in 2000 to give children an opportunity to explore science in a classroom, library, festival, or youth center setting. The program covers a broad range of science topics, including biology, ecology, physics, chemistry, and math. All programs address objectives outlined in the Michigan Grade Level Content Expectations and include pre- and post-visit activities.

Types of outreach programs
Single Visit Workshops are for Pre K-8th grade classrooms. Series Workshops last anywhere from 3–12 weeks for classes that wish for more in-depth science exploration. Family Fun Science Nights include interactive science and math activities geared towards the whole family, encouraging parental involvement in their children's learning. The Virtual Distance Learning Program uses videoconferencing to engage students in an interactive program, and includes materials and a Teacher's Guide to help prepare for experiments in the classroom. The museum's latest program, Energy on the Road, is sponsored by the DTE Energy Foundation and plans to teach students about renewable energy.

News and recognitions

The Ann Arbor Hands-On Museum has received numerous awards, grants, and publicity for its innovations and immersive learning experience, including a grant from the Michigan Council for Arts and Cultural Affairs (MCACA)

This museum's influences go farther than just those who visit. In 2013, the Ann Arbor Hands-On Museum partnered with C.S. Mott Children's Hospital and Von Voigtlander Women's Hospital, both in Ann Arbor, to help fund and implement the Healing Through Hands-On Science program. This program helps bring science and health related activities and exhibits to the museum and to the hospitals themselves to provide a more enriching stay. It also helps to provide fun activities for the siblings and families of patients at C.S. Mott Children's Hospital who may otherwise miss out on them from being out of school.

The museum has also paired up with the Mechanical Engineering department at the University of Michigan to win an Editor's Award for outstanding exhibitions at the Maker Faire in 2010 which was held at The Henry Ford in Dearborn. The students and faculty of the Mechanical Engineering department presented the inverted pendulum, much like those in a human transporter Segway, to highlight the importance of feedback controls and balance in systems. This exhibit can now be found at the museum and features a vertical pendulum that is driven by a motor at the end of a horizontal arm and uses sensors to keep the pendulum in its inverted position.

Among many of the other technology and science driven exhibits at the museum is the Ferrofluid Magnetoscope. This world-renowned interactive exhibit was created by Ann Arbor inventor Michael Flynn who debuted the first version of the magnetoscope at the Work Gallery in the School of Art and Design at the University of Michigan. Flynn has also showcased his creation around the world in Scotland, Ireland, and Italy. The Ferrofluid Magnetoscope at the Ann Arbor Hands-On Museum is one of only 250 that are available for viewing.

The museum building, the former Ann Arbor Central Fire Station, was built in 1882.  It was added to the National Register of Historic Places in 1972.

Museum exhibits
Permanent exhibits

Concourse
An open lobby that visitors can engage in many fun activities including  whisper dishes, the tornado, Building in a Building, Liquid Galaxy, The Inverted Pendulum and the water table.

All About You
An exhibit that explores the human body. Visitors can climb aboard a full-sized Huron City Ambulance, hear their heartbeat and measure Physical fitness.

Preschool Gallery
An area designed for children four years old and younger.  Visitors can splash into the water tables, dress up like fire fighters and play on a child-sized fire engine.

Legacy Gallery 
Displays a variety of simply machines to present how seemingly complex systems work.  Visitors can learn how traffic lights work, and the magnetisms behind Teslas Egg of Columbus.

Michigan Nature Discover Room
A pure Michigan experience that includes a soundscape, an interactive nature wall, native lake fish and geology samples.  Major funding for this exhibit provided by Hooked on Nature and the James A & Faith Knight Foundation with additional support from Friends of the Museum. Murals by Robert Zuboff and the scientific illustration students from the University of Michigan.

World Around You
A gallery intended to spark the imagination of visitors.  This exhibit features The Bubble Capsule, magnet exhibits, and a climbing wall.

Lyon's Country Store Exhibit 
This exhibit recreates a country store setting from the 1930s.  It is one of the area's few exhibits that allows visitors to handle real, historic artifacts once found in general stores nearly a century ago.  Inside the Country Store you can see how an old-fashioned cash register worked, listen to period music on a Victrola-like speaker, play a game of checkers on an old checkerboard set atop a barrel, and see old toys and games that children enjoyed decades ago. The store is a tribute to Bob Lyons, an avid collector of historic memorabilia and a founder of the Museum back in 1982.

DTE Energy Foundation Light and Optics
Visitors can experience the characteristics of light and optics by playing the stringless Laser harp, breaking white light into the spectrum of colors it's made of, or catching your shadow on the wall.  Visitors can also watch how refraction bends light and distorts images, see how objects look different under light emitted by different materials, and observe how [Photon polarization|polarizing] light can change its brightness and color.

Media Works
This exhibit helps visitors discover the science of television and telecommunications.

New exhibits

Blast Off
Allows visitors to fill a rocket with pressurized air and launch a rocket into the air.  Designed by Creative Machines, you can test how much pressure it takes for a rocket to reach our ceiling. Each rocket locks into place and fills with a variable amount of air pressure.

Recollections
As you dance to a variety of music, a camera senses your movements and transforms them into colorful images on a screen.

Block Party II
The Block Party is a creative construction site for junior architects and engineers.  Visitors can build towers and structures by using foam blocks.

Magnetoscope
Allows people to manipulate magnetic fields to create amazing patterns in ferrofluid.  Guests turn one of the cranks clockwise or counterclockwise to raise and lower the magnets and observe the fluid as it changes shape and shows changes in the magnetic field.

References

External links
 
 Ann Arbor Hands-On Museum
 Michigan Grade Level Content Expectations

Museums established in 1978
Science museums in Michigan
Museums in Ann Arbor, Michigan
1978 establishments in Michigan
Michigan State Historic Sites in Washtenaw County, Michigan
Children's museums in Michigan